Pierre Dominik Becken (born 28 September 1987) is a German footballer who plays as a centre-back or defensive midfielder for BSV Schwarz-Weiß Rehden.

Career
Born in Flensburg, Becken spent his early career with a number of clubs in northern Germany, including two years with FC St. Pauli's reserve team. In January 2012 he signed for Carl Zeiss Jena, where he made his 3. Liga debut as a substitute for Robert Zickert in a 1–1 draw with 1. FC Saarbrücken. Jena were relegated from the 3. Liga at the end of the 2011–12 season, so Becken signed for Hallescher FC, along with Nils Pichinot, who he had also played alongside at St. Pauli. He left Halle at the end of the 2013–14 season and returned to Jena.

References

External links 
 
 

1987 births
Living people
People from Flensburg
German footballers
Association football midfielders
3. Liga players
Regionalliga players
FC St. Pauli players
FC Carl Zeiss Jena players
Hallescher FC players
FC Rot-Weiß Erfurt players
Berliner AK 07 players
BSV Schwarz-Weiß Rehden players
Footballers from Schleswig-Holstein